Yenice District is a district of the Çanakkale Province of Turkey. Its seat is the town of Yenice. Its area is 1,381 km2, and its population is 31,080 (2021).

Composition
There are two municipalities in Yenice District:
 Kalkım
 Yenice

There are 76 villages in Yenice District:

 Ahiler
 Akçakoyun
 Akköy
 Alancık
 Araovacık
 Armutcuk
 Aşağıçavuş
 Aşağıinova
 Aşağıkaraaşık
 Bağlı
 Ballıçay
 Başkoz
 Bayatlar
 Bekten
 Boynanlar
 Cambaz
 Çakır
 Çakıroba
 Çal
 Çamoba
 Çınarcık
 Çınarköy
 Çırpılar
 Çiftlik
 Çukuroba
 Darıalan
 Davutköy
 Engeci
 Gümüşler
 Gündoğdu
 Güzeloba
 Hacılar
 Hacıyusuflar
 Hamdibey
 Haydaroba
 Hıdırlar
 Kabalı
 Kalabakbaşı
 Karaaydın
 Karabey
 Karadoru
 Karaköy
 Karasu
 Kargacı
 Kırıklar
 Kızıldam
 Koruköy
 Kovancı
 Kurtlar
 Kuzupınarı
 Namazgah
 Nevruz
 Oğlanalanı
 Öğmen
 Örencik
 Pazarköy
 Reşadiye
 Sameteli
 Sarıçayır
 Sazak
 Seyvan
 Sofular
 Soğucak
 Suuçtu
 Taban
 Torhasan
 Üçkabaağaç
 Umurlar
 Yağdıran
 Yalıoba
 Yarış
 Yeniköy
 Yeşilköy
 Yukarıçavuş
 Yukarıinova
 Yukarıkaraaşık

References

Districts of Çanakkale Province